Muhammad Yogi Novrian (born November 13, 1994) is an Indonesian professional footballer who plays for Liga 2 club Persiba Balikpapan as a winger.

Honours

Club 
Sriwijaya U-21
 Indonesia Super League U-21: 2012–13
Persebaya Surabaya
 Liga 2: 2017

References

External links 
Yogi Novrian - Profile at Soccerway
Yogi Novrian - Profile at Liga Indonesia

1994 births
Living people
Indonesian footballers
Association football midfielders
Persela Lamongan players
Persebaya Surabaya players
PSPS Pekanbaru players
People from Palembang